Lucaya International School is an international school in Freeport, Grand Bahama Island. The schools offers early years to grade 13 education to Bahamians and foreign residents.

The school
The school was founded in 1998 with the main goal of offering an internationally based curriculum to the expatriate and local community. The school has an enrollment of 230 students. Approximately 40% are Bahamian Nationals, with the remainder coming from over 30 countries. The school  is located in the suburb of Lucaya, on an open campus with sport fields.

Curriculum
The school is authorized to offer the International Baccalaureate Organization IB Primary Years Programme (PYP) to primary age students, and the IB Diploma Programme to secondary students.  Middle years students are offered an adapted UK National Curriculum, and the school offers IGCSE exams in Year 11.

References

International Baccalaureate schools in the Bahamas
International schools in the Bahamas
Grand Bahama
1998 establishments in the Bahamas
Educational institutions established in 1998